Agdistis satanas is a moth in the family Pterophoridae. It is known from the Balearic Islands, Portugal, Spain, France, Corsica, Italy (Piedmont, Val d’Aosta, Latium, Apulia, Sardinia, Sicily), Malta, Germany, Albania, Romania, Bulgaria, Greece, Crete, Turkey, Israel, Algeria, Tunisia, Libya and Morocco.

The wingspan is about 20 mm. Adults are on wing from April to September.

The larvae feed on Scabiosa candicans, Scabiosa pyrenaica, Scleranthus species and Limoniastrum monopetalum.

References

Agdistinae
Moths of Europe
Moths described in 1875